Point Branch is a  long first-order tributary to Prospect Branch in Kent County, Delaware.  This is the only stream of this name in the United States.

Course
Point Branch rises on the Booth Branch divide about 1-mile southeast of Andrewsville, Delaware, and then flows south and west to join Prospect Branch about 1-mile south-southeast of Vernon, Delaware.

Watershed
Point Branch drains  of area, receives about 45.2 in/year of precipitation, and is about 1% forested.

See also
List of rivers of Delaware

References

Rivers of Delaware
Rivers of Kent County, Delaware